Asaphodes obarata is a moth in the family Geometridae. It is endemic to New Zealand and has been collected in both the North and South Islands. It seems to inhabit the margins of native forest and also frequents plains with an affinity for gorse hedges. The host plants of the larvae of this species are unknown. The adults are on the wing in December and January. It is classified as critically endangered by the Department of Conservation. There has been a contraction of range of A. obarata with it now being regarded as locally extinct in both Dunedin and Invercargill.

Taxonomy

This species was first described by Cajetan Felder and Alois Friedrich Rogenhofer  in 1875 as Cidaria obarata. The female holotype specimen was collected by Thomas R. Oxley in Nelson and is held at the Natural History Museum in London. Edward Meyrick placed the species within the genus Larentia in 1884. In 1898 George Vernon Hudson placed the species within the genus Xanthorhoe. In 1971 John S. Dugdale assigned Xanthorhoe obarata to the genus Asaphodes. In 1988 Dugdale confirmed this placement in his catalogue of New Zealand Lepidoptera.

Description 

Hudson described A. obarata as follows:

Distribution 
Asaphodes obarata is endemic to New Zealand. As well as Nelson, it has been collected in Wellington, Christchurch and at the foot of Mount Hutt. It has also been collected at Waimarino and Ohakune in the North Island as well as Akaroa, Otira, Dunedin, Queenstown and Invercargill in the South Island.

There has been a contraction of range in Dunedin and Southland and this species is now regarded as being locally extinct in both Dunedin and Invercargill.

Ecology and habitat
Hudson states that this species could be found on the margins of forests and R. W. Fereday communicated that it was a plain-frequenting species that has an affinity for gorse hedges. Hudson also stated that adult moths were on the wing in December and January.

Host plants 
The host plants of this species are unknown.

Conservation status
This moth is classified under the New Zealand Threat Classification system as being Nationally Critical. It has been hypothesised that this species is under threat as a likely result of habitat loss.

References

Moths described in 1875
Moths of New Zealand
Larentiinae
Endemic fauna of New Zealand
Endangered biota of New Zealand
Endemic moths of New Zealand